East Coast Barbarians is a Norwegian rugby team. They currently compete in the Norway Rugby Championship. The team is not a club as such, as it contains players from different clubs that have too low player numbers to compete individually. The club contains players from Tønsberg, Horten, Høyskolen i Vestfold and NMBU (Ås).

Norwegian rugby union teams